Nam Nami (also Romanized as Nam Namī; also known as Shab Kūhī and Shāh Kūhī) is a village in Jahangiri Rural District, in the Central District of Masjed Soleyman County, Khuzestan Province, Iran. At the 2006 census, its population was 55, in 11 families.

References 

Populated places in Masjed Soleyman County